Mount Bisotoun (or Behistun and Bisotun) is a mountain of the Zagros Mountains range, located in Kermanshah Province of western Iran.

Cultural history
It is well known for the famous Behistun Inscription and rock relief in which the great Achaemenian King, Darius the Great, had the narrative of his exploits carved around 500 BC.

Legends

A legend began around Mount Bisotoun, as written about by the Persian poet Nezami about a man named Farhad, who was a lover of Shirin. The legend states that, exiled for his transgression, Farhad was given the task of cutting away the mountain; if he succeeded, he would be given permission to marry Shirin. After many years and the removal of half the mountain, he did find water, but was informed by Khosrow that Shirin had died. He went mad, threw his axe down the hill, kissed the ground and died. It is told in the book of Khosrow and Shirin that his axe was made out of a pomegranate tree, and, where he threw the axe, a pomegranate tree grew with fruit that would cure the ill. Shirin was not dead, according to the story, and mourned upon hearing the news.

Gallery 

Zagros Mountains
Behistun
Archaeological sites in Iran
Inscribed rocks
Mountains of Iran